Bioallethrin is a brand name for an ectoparasiticide. It consists of two of the eight stereoisomers of allethrin I in an approximate ratio of 1:1. The name Bioallethrin is a registered trademark of Sumitomo Chemical.

Esbiothrin (CAS number ) is a mixture of the same two stereoisomers, but in an approximate ratio of R:S = 1:3.

Esbioallethrin or S-bioallethrin (CAS number ) is the pure S-form (that is, the wedge in the structure as shown in the box points down).

The name bioallethrin is a common name approved by the British Standards Institution and published in.

References

Allethrins
Allyl compounds